Jules Cyrus Angelle Trinité  (22 December 1856 in Saint-Quentin-des-Isles – 17 December 1921 in Azay-le-Rideau) was a French sport shooter and he won a Silver medal in Shooting at the 1900 Summer Olympics in Paris.

References

External links
 

1856 births
1921 deaths
Olympic silver medalists for France
Olympic shooters of France
Shooters at the 1900 Summer Olympics
Olympic medalists in shooting
Medalists at the 1900 Summer Olympics
Sportspeople from Eure
French male sport shooters